O Tempo É Agora is the second studio album by Brazilian duo Anavitória, released on 3 August 2018 via Forasteiro and Universal. It was produced by Moogie Canazio and Tiago Iorc, the latter continuing his role from their first album. Em 2019, the album won the Latin Grammy for Best Portuguese Language Contemporary Pop Album.

Reception

Critical 
Pedro Antunes from O Estado de S. Paulo said "it's curious to notice how the innocence was lost. They're still Anavitória, more optimistic than any other thing, but their songs now suffer. Because not everything is about flowers, bare feet and filled beds, after all". He also thought Ana Caetano was now a better composer and did not put too much weight on the metaphors, dealing with senses and feelings".

Robson Gomes, from Jornal do Commercio, said "musically speaking, little has changed since the 2016 debut album and O Tempo é Agora. But the more recent work is marked by the maturing of lyrics and their evolution as artists."

Mauro Ferreira, from G1, said "Anavitória's sound has been being ground on the show business machine. (...) The album O tempo é agora is the result of this urgency in explore the moment and exhaust a success formula that, perhaps, won't be so effective in the market". He also believes that this supposed commercial exploit impacted in the duo's music. "What sounded natural in the 2016 album (...) already seems artificial in the current one (...). He ended his review saying that "if everything – sold out shows, hundreds of views in video platforms, the fans fervor – is gone in a probably still distant future, Anavitória might still resist in the scene due to the essence that the music industry cannot grind to the full in the albumO tempo é agora."

O Tempo É Agora was ranked as the 37th best Brazilian album of 2018 by Rolling Stone Brasil.

Accolades

Certifications

Track listing 
The standard edition of the album contains eleven tracks.

Promotion

O Tempo É Agora Tour 
Following the end of the tour with Nando Reis in July 2018, it was announced that a semi-fictional movie featuring the duo as protagonists would be released in August, named Ana e Vitória. The album was announced on the same day. On 18 December 2020, the duo released the show in a film format, titled O Tempo É Agora: Ao Vivo na Fundição.

Personnel 
 Ana Caetano — lead vocals
 Vitória Falcão — lead vocals
 Mike Tulio — volead vocals
 Jamie Wollam — drums
 Sean Hurley — bass
 Tim Pierce — guitars
 Roberto Pollo — keyboards
 Jamie Muhoberac — keyboards
 Recording engineer — Moogie Canazio
 Recording assistants — Matt Wolach, Bo Bodnar, June Murakawa, Daniel Pampury
 Digital editing — Moogie Canazio
 Musical production — Tiago Iorc and Moogie Canazio
 Executive production and direction — Felipe Simas
 A&R direction — Miguel Cariello
 A&R manager — Miguel Afonso
 A&R coordination — Igor Alarcon, Marina Furtado, Patricia Aidas, Clarice Carrilho
 Label manager — Bárbara Cotta
 Production manager — Isadora Silveira

References 

Anavitória albums
2018 albums
Latin Grammy Award for Best Portuguese Language Contemporary Pop Album
Portuguese-language albums